A seven-layer dip is an American appetizer based on ingredients typical of Tex-Mex cuisine. The first widely published recipe (1981, Family Circle magazine) called it Tex-Mex Dip without reference to any layers. The dish was popular in Texas for some time before the recipe first appeared in print.

The dish typically includes:

 Refried beans (originally commercial jalapeño bean dip)
 Guacamole (originally mashed seasoned avocados) 
 Sour cream (originally a mixture of sour cream & mayonnaise seasoned with commercial taco seasoning mix)
 Pico de gallo, salsa roja, salsa verde or chopped tomatoes (originally simply chopped green onions, tomatoes and onions) 
 Grated cheddar cheese, Monterey Jack cheese, queso asadero, queso Chihuahua or a blend (some early recipes substituted processed commercial jalapeño cheese dip - or homemade chile con queso) 
 Black olives
 Optional ingredients and variations include many items such as chopped onion, cooked ground beef, shredded lettuce (for texture), or sliced jalapeño chiles for additional spiciness.

The dish is often chilled when not served immediately. Originally served with corn chips, seven-layer dip is now served most often with tortilla chips.

See also
 Bean dip
 Chips and dip
 Dip (food)
 List of dips
 List of hors d'oeuvre
 Seven-layer salad

References

Mexican cuisine
Dips (food)
Appetizers
Tex-Mex cuisine